The 2016 North Carolina State Senate elections selected members to serve in the North Carolina Senate for a two-year term commencing in January 2017. Going into the election, the Senate had 34 Republican and 16 Democratic members, which constituted a two-thirds super-majority for the Republican Party. Following the election, the Senate had 35 Republican and 15 Democratic members.

Results

District 1
Incumbent Republican Bill Cook has represented the 1st district since 2013.

District 2
Incumbent Republican Norman W. Sanderson has represented the 2nd district since 2013.

District 3
Incumbent Democrat Erica D. Smith has represented the 3rd district since 2015.

District 4
Incumbent Democrat Angela Bryant has represented the 4th district since 2013.

District 5
Incumbent Democrat Donald G. Davis has represented the 5th district since 2013 and previously from 2009 to 2011.

District 6
Incumbent Republican Majority Leader Harry Brown has represented the 6th district since 2004.

District 7
Incumbent Republican Louis Pate has represented the 7th district and its predecessors since 2011.

District 8
Incumbent Republican Bill Rabon has represented the 8th district since 2011.

District 9
Incumbent Republican Michael Lee has represented the 9th district since 2014.

District 10
Incumbent Republican Brent Jackson has represented the 10th district since 2011.

District 11
Incumbent Republican Buck Newton has represented the 11th district since 2011.  Newton unsuccessfully sought election to become NC Attorney General.

District 12
Incumbent Republican Ronald J. Rabin has represented the 12th district since 2013.

District 13
Incumbent Democrat Jane W. Smith has represented the 13th district since 2015.  Smith lost re-election to Republican Danny Earl Britt, Jr.

District 14
Incumbent Democrat Dan Blue has represented the 14th district since 2009.

District 15
Incumbent Republican John Alexander has represented the 15th district since 2015.

District 16
Incumbent Democrat Jay Chaudhuri has represented the 16th district since 2016. Chaudhuri is seeking his first full term.

District 17
Incumbent Republican Tamara Barringer has represented the 17th district since 2013.

District 18
Incumbent Republican Chad Barefoot has represented 18th district since 2013.

District 19
Incumbent Republican Wesley Meredith has represented the 19th district since 2011.

District 20
Incumbent Democrat Floyd McKissick Jr. has represented the 20th district since 2007.

District 21
Incumbent Democrat Ben Clark has represented the 21st district since 2013.

District 22
Incumbent Democrat Mike Woodard has represented the 22nd district since 2013.

District 23
Incumbent Democrat Valerie Foushee has represented the 23rd district since 2013.

District 24
Incumbent Republican Rick Gunn has represented the 24th district since 2011.

District 25
Incumbent Republican Tom McInnis has represented the 25th district since 2015.

District 26
Incumbent Republican President Pro Tempore Phil Berger has represented the 26th district since and its predecessors since 2001.

District 27
Incumbent Republican Trudy Wade has represented the 27th district since 2013.

District 28
Incumbent Democrat Gladys Robinson has represented the 28th district since 2011.

District 29
Incumbent Republican Jerry Tillman has represented the 29th district since

District 30
Incumbent Republican Shirley B. Randleman has represented the 30th district since 2012.

District 31
Incumbent Republican Joyce Krawiec has represented the 31st district since 2014.

District 32
Incumbent Democrat Paul Lowe, Jr. has represented the 32nd district since 2015.

District 33
Incumbent Republican Stan Bingham has represented the 33rd district and its predecessors since 2001.  Bingham didn't seek re-election.

District 34
Incumbent Republican Andrew Brock has represented the 34th district since 2003.

District 35
Incumbent Republican Tommy Tucker has represented the 35th district since 2011.

District 36
Incumbent Republican Fletcher L. Hartsell Jr. has represented the 36th district and its predecessors since 1991.  Hartsell didn't seek re-election. Republican Paul Newton won the open seat.

District 37
Incumbent Democrat Jeff Jackson has represented the 37th district since 2014.

District 38
Incumbent Democrat Joel D. M. Ford has represented the 38th district since 2013.

District 39
Incumbent Republican Bob Rucho has represented the 39th district since 2008.  Rucho didn't seek re-election. Representative Dan Bishop won the open seat.

District 40
Incumbent Democrat Joyce Waddell has represented the 40th district since 2015.

District 41
Incumbent Republican Jeff Tarte has represented the 41st district since 2013.

District 42
Incumbent Republican Andy Wells has represented the 42nd district since 2015.

District 43
Incumbent Republican Kathy Harrington has represented the 43rd district since 2011.

District 44
Incumbent Republican David L. Curtis has represented the 44th district since 2013.

District 45
Incumbent Republican Deanna Ballard has represented the 45th district since 2016.

District 46
Incumbent Republican Warren Daniel has represented the 46th district and its predecessors since 2011.

District 47
Incumbent Republican Ralph Hise has represented the 47th district since 2011.

District 48
Incumbent Republican Chuck Edwards has represented the 48th district since 2016.

District 49
Incumbent Democrat Terry Van Duyn has represented the 49th district since 2014.

District 50
Incumbent Republican Jim Davis has represented the 50th district since 2011.

References

Senate
North Carolina Senate elections
North Carolina Senate